Churmaq (also Romanized as Chūrmaq and Chowrmaq; also known as Choormagh Sardrood) is a village in Boghrati Rural District, Sardrud District, Razan County, Hamadan Province, Iran. At the 2006 census, its population was 1,834, in 403 families.

References 

Populated places in Razan County